June is a Polish band playing a mixture of soul and jazz. It was founded in 2008 by musicians/music producers Jan Smoczyński, Robert Cichy and Krzysztof Pacan. All three musicians have previously worked with Polish artists such as Smolik, Anna Maria Jopek, Michał Urbaniak, Urszula Dudziak, Ania Dąbrowska. In 2009, the band was nominated for a Fryderyk award.

History

That's What I Like (2008–2011) 
The band's debut album That's What I Like was released on 12 September 2008. Polish singer Kayah decided to release it through her label Kayax and made a guest appearance in a song "Be Yourself". The other guest vocalist on the record was Paulina "Pinnawela" Przybysz (formerly Sistars), who sang in "No F No L".

In 2009, the band was nominated for the Fryderyk award in New Face of Fonography category.

July Stars (2011–present) 
June's sophomore album, July Stars, was released in May 2012 as a double album. The second disc contains songs with guest vocals by Urszula Dudziak, Kayah, Kasia Nosowska, Ania Dąbrowska, Aga Zaryan, Mika Urbaniak, Andrzej Dąbrowski, Marcelina Stoszek and Patrycja Gola.

On 4 July 2012, the band performed at the Tent Stage at Open'er Festival.

Musical style 
June's music has been influenced by artists like N.E.R.D, OutKast, Jill Scott, Lauryn Hill and Erykah Badu.

Band members 
 Jan Smoczyński – piano (2008–present)
 Robert Cichy – guitar, vocals (2008–present)
 Krzysztof Pacan – (2008–present)

Discography

Albums

Awards and nominations

Fryderyk

|-
| 2009 || June || New Face of Fonography ||

References

External links
Official website

Polish jazz
Musical groups established in 2008